Doliopsoididae is a family of tunicates belonging to the order Doliolida.

Genera:
 Doliopsoides Krüger, 1939

References

Tunicates